Nick Owcharuk is an American retired soccer goalkeeper who played professionally in the American Soccer League and Major Indoor Soccer League and North American Soccer League.

In 1976, Owcharuk signed with the Minnesota Kicks of the North American Soccer League.  He played three games, then was released.  He joined the San Diego Sockers in the early part of the 1978 season, then moved to the Tulsa Roughnecks in 1979.  He played a handful of games for the Roughnecks during the 1979–1980 NASL indoor season.  In the fall of 1980, he signed with the Phoenix Inferno of the Major Indoor Soccer League.  In 1981, he played for the Rochester Flash of the American Soccer League.

External links
  Career stats

Living people
1955 births
American soccer players
American Soccer League (1933–1983) players
Association football goalkeepers
Major Indoor Soccer League (1978–1992) players
Minnesota Kicks players
North American Soccer League (1968–1984) players
North American Soccer League (1968–1984) indoor players
Rochester Flash players
Phoenix Inferno players
San Diego Sockers (NASL) players
Soccer players from Chicago